Frederick Eutrope Degazon (4 January 1913 – 4 October 2008) was a Dominican politician who served as the first President of the country from 1979 to 1980.

Biography 
He was born in Castries, Saint Lucia in January 1913.

Degazon went to college in Saint Lucia and studied law in the University of London. He practised law privately in Saint Lucia and Dominica from 1934 to 1940. In the 1940s he served as a civil servant in Dominica, Saint Lucia and Jamaica until his retirement in 1969. He was elected Speaker of the House of Assembly in 1977 and after declaration of independence in 1978, parliament elected Degazon as first President of Dominica, the post is largely ceremonial.

In June 1979, during a constitutional crisis stirred by the desire for democratic socialist reforms, Degazon tried to leave the country and was eventually allowed to flee to England on 11 June. The House of Assembly initially elected as his replacement Louis Cools-Lartigue, who resigned the next day, and he was then replaced by Jenner Armour. Degazon officially resigned in February 1980. He resided in London until his death there on 4 October 2008, at the age of 95.

References

External links
.

1913 births
2008 deaths
Alumni of the University of London
Dominica exiles
Dominica people of Saint Lucian descent
People from Castries Quarter
Presidents of Dominica
Speakers of the House of Assembly of Dominica